is a Japanese video game based on the anime series Megazone 23. The game was released for the PlayStation 3 on September 13, 2007 in Japan by Compile Heart. The game is available in two different packages "Original" and "Over Seas Edition".

The game takes place 21 years after the end of Part 1 of Megazone 23 in an alternate continuity to part 2.

Over Seas Edition
Over Seas Edition is a limited edition print by Compile Heart to be released along with its original copies of the game. This edition comes bundled with a game setting guidebook with full-color artwork and a DVD, "Megazone 23 INTERNATIONAL PART II" (Region 2) -- the full movie of Part II with the original English dub, using Harmony Gold voice actors, complete with the intro of Part I's alternate (non-canonical) ending with footage used in Robotech: The Movie and a narrated summary of the (canonical) events of Part I.

References

External links
 Official Website (Japanese) 

2007 video games
Role-playing video games
PlayStation 3-only games
Japan-exclusive video games
Video games based on anime and manga
Video games developed in Japan
PlayStation 3 games